Selena Eloise Charteris (born 5 June 1981) is a New Zealand former cricketer who played as a right-arm off break bowler. She appeared in five One Day Internationals and two Twenty20 Internationals for New Zealand in 2007. She played domestic cricket for Canterbury.

References

External links
 
 

1981 births
Living people
Cricketers from Timaru
New Zealand women cricketers
New Zealand women One Day International cricketers
New Zealand women Twenty20 International cricketers
Canterbury Magicians cricketers